This is a list of radio stations in Pakistan.

Azad Jammu & Kashmir

Balochistan

Federally Administered Tribal Areas

Gilgit Baltistan

Islamabad Capital Territory

AM

FM

Internet

Khyber Pakhtunkhwa

AM

FM

Punjab

AM

FM

Sindh

AM

FM

Internet

See also 
 Mass media in Pakistan
 Pakistan Broadcasting Corporation (PBC)
 Pakistan Electronic Media Regulatory Authority
 List of Pakistani television channels

References

Pakistan